Basilensis, a Latin adjective referring to the city of Basel, may refer to:
 Codex Basilensis (disambiguation), several books
 Cupriavidus basilensis, a bacterium species
 Ralstonia basilensis, a Gram-negative soil bacterium species